Nevers Mumba (born 1960 in Chitambo at Chitambo Mission, Zambia) is a Zambian politician and religious minister. He is the current leader of the Movement for Multi-Party Democracy. He served as the eighth vice-president of Zambia in 2003–04 under Levy Mwanawasa.

Early life and career 

Mumba grew up with his parents and 11 brothers and sisters in Chinsali, in a religious home. His father Sunday Mumba was a teacher and pastor at the United Church of Zambia. He was baptised as a member of the UCZ by Rev. Paul Mushindo.

Mumba had his primary education at Chinsali Basic School. After getting very good grades at his Grade 7 examination, he was selected to go to one of the two best schools in the country, Hilcrest Technical High School. Whilst there, he joined the Zambia Combined Cadet Force (ZCCF) and rose to the rank of Provincial Commandant for Southern Province.

He then went to the Zambia National Service for one-year compulsory training. Here he had hoped to become a full military man, but he changed his mind, left, and went to work in the mines on the Copperbelt province.

There, he decided to join the Pentecostal Movement and joined Maranathan Church where he became a church elder under Bishop Sky Banda at age 19. The following year, in 1980, he left and founded Victory Bible Church and Victory Ministries International.

In 1997, he founded the National Christian Coalition, a Christian political movement. It was registered as a political party in 1998. It participated in the 2001 Zambia general election, where Mumba emerged as 5th out of over 11 candidates.

He was Zambia's High Commissioner to Canada from 2009 until 2011.

On 25 May 2012, Mumba was elected as President of the Movement for Multiparty Democracy (MMD) political party, which had been in opposition since its defeat in the 2011 presidential election. He defeated rival Felix Mutati along with several other candidates.

References

BBC biography
Nevers Mumba: Zambia for Christ
Zambia High Commission in Canada
MMD Victory

1960 births
Living people
Vice-presidents of Zambia
High Commissioners of Zambia to Canada
Zambian Protestants
National Citizens' Coalition politicians
Movement for Multi-Party Democracy politicians